"Arpanet" is the seventh episode of the second season of the American television drama series The Americans, and the 20th overall episode of the series.  It originally aired on FX in the United States on April 9, 2014.

Plot
After consulting with Arkady and Oleg, and with the promise of coaching from Oleg, Nina tells Stan that she will take the FBI's polygraph test. Oleg suggests a few techniques including that she visualize him in the room as well as clenching her anus. During the polygraph test, the FBI asks if she knows who killed Vlad. She answers yes while looking at Stan knowingly. After she passes, she declines Stan's offer to get her out of the embassy, saying that she will be able to help him more after she is read into the Illegals Program. It is revealed that Nina and Oleg were planning this together. They celebrate their success and have sex in a hotel room.

Kate relays orders for Philip to bug the ARPANET. Philip recruits the help of Charles Duluth, an alcoholic conservative journalist who is also a KGB agent. Posing as a journalist, Philip first meets with a computer scientist at a university to learn the details of ARPANET. Later, Philip and Duluth break into the university to plant the bug. Philip is forced to set off the alarms in order to enter the computer lab undetected, but is forced to kill one of the employees when they return to grab their wallet. Philip later finds Duluth drinking at the bar. Duluth expresses exhilaration over the success of the mission, and a more reserved Philip reveals he was forced to kill the worker.

With Philip watching afar with a sniper rifle, Larrick tells Elizabeth that he has been ordered to Nicaragua, to set up a base and mine the harbor of Managua, but he will still be able to let them into the Contra training camp before he leaves.  Lucia is upset to learn this, because (as she tells Elizabeth) she planned to kill Larrick there in revenge for his atrocities in Nicaragua. Elizabeth tells her that Larrick is more valuable as a cooperating asset, and expresses her doubts about Lucia's reliability to Philip.

Henry observes a neighbor's house with his telescope, and sneaks in to play Intellivision while they are gone, something his parents had forbidden him from doing.

Production
The episode was written by Joshua Brand and directed by Kevin Dowling.

Reception
The episode was watched by 1.18 million viewers, as per Nielsen ratings. The reviews for the episode were positive. The A.V. Club rated gave the episode an A−. Alan Sepinwall from Hitfix reviewed the episode positively.

References

External links
 "Arpanet" at FX
 

The Americans (season 2) episodes
2014 American television episodes